Bon Kuh-e Olya (also Romanized as Bon Kūh-e ‘Olyā; also known as Bon Kūh-e Bālā and Ponkūh) is a village in Rezvan Rural District, Jebalbarez District, Jiroft County, Kerman Province, Iran. At the 2006 census, its population was 17, in 6 families.

References 

Populated places in Jiroft County